Otrøy Church (historical: Sør-Aukra Church) is a parish church of the Church of Norway in Molde Municipality in Møre og Romsdal county, Norway. It is the main church for the Midsund parish which is part of the Molde domprosti (arch-deanery) in the Diocese of Møre. The white, wooden church was built in a long church design in 1878 using plans by the architect Jacob Wilhelm Nordan. The church seats about 250 people.

This was the main church of the old Sør-Aukra municipality, and at that time it was called Sør-Aukra church. In 1968, the church was enlarged.

See also
List of churches in Møre

References

Buildings and structures in Molde
Churches in Møre og Romsdal
Long churches in Norway
Wooden churches in Norway
19th-century Church of Norway church buildings
Churches completed in 1878
1878 establishments in Norway